Britta Kristin Büthe (born 25 May 1988 in Dearborn, Michigan) is an American-born German beach volleyball player. She won a silver medal at the 2013 World Championships alongside her teammate Karla Borger. At the 2016 Summer Olympics in Rio de Janeiro, she competed in women's beach volleyball with teammate Kara Borger. They were defeated by the Brazilian team of Larissa França and Talita Antunes in the round of 16.

References

External links
 
 
 
 
 

German women's beach volleyball players
1988 births
Living people
Sportspeople from Michigan
Beach volleyball players at the 2016 Summer Olympics
Olympic beach volleyball players of Germany